Peerless Trout 238 is an Indian reserve of the Peerless Trout First Nation in Alberta, located within the Municipal District of Opportunity No. 17.

References

Indian reserves in Alberta